Frederick Light (11 December 1906 – 1963) was a British long-distance runner. He competed in the men's 5000 metres at the 1928 Summer Olympics.

References

1906 births
1963 deaths
Athletes (track and field) at the 1928 Summer Olympics
British male long-distance runners
Olympic athletes of Great Britain
Place of birth missing